Zaur Gekkiyev (born February 12, 1961, in Lashkuta, Soviet Union) is a Russian political figure and a deputy of the  6th, 7th and 8th State Dumas.

In 2002 Gekkiyev was granted a Candidate of Economic Sciences degree. In 2000 he was appointed the Deputy Head of Administration of Nalchik. In 2002–2003, he was a Minister of Resorts and Tourism of the Kabardino-Balkaria. He was a deputy of the Parliament of the Kabardino-Balkarian Republic of the 3rd and 4th convocations. In 2011 he was elected deputy of the 6th State Duma from the Kabardino-Balkaria constituency. Gekkiyev ran with the United Russia. In 2016 and 2021, he was re-elected for the 7th and 8th State Dumas respectively.

On 24 March 2022, the United States Treasury sanctioned him in response to the 2022 Russian invasion of Ukraine.

References

1961 births
Living people
United Russia politicians
21st-century Russian politicians
Sixth convocation members of the State Duma (Russian Federation)
Seventh convocation members of the State Duma (Russian Federation)
Eighth convocation members of the State Duma (Russian Federation)
Russian individuals subject to the U.S. Department of the Treasury sanctions